The UNTV Cup Season 8 was the 2019–2020 season of the annual charity basketball league in the Philippines, UNTV Cup. The tournament is organized by UNTV under the UNTV-37 Foundation, Inc., thru its chairman and chief executive officer of BMPI-UNTV, "Mr. Public Service" Kuya Daniel Razon.

The season officially opened on September 9, 2019 at the Mall of Asia Arena in Pasay. Regular games are held at the Pasig City Sports Center in Pasig and San Juan Gym in San Juan City with a live telecast on the UNTV Public Service channel every Sunday afternoon. Twelve teams are competing for the championship title this season.

The best-of-three finals series was held on March 1 and 9, 2020, at the Paco Arena in Manila City and Smart Araneta Coliseum in Cubao, Quezon City, respectively. The championship is between the three-time defending champion AFP Cavaliers and rookie team DENR Warriors. DENR swept the series against AFP in two games, 2–0, to get their first title in their first season, and become the only rookie team to do so.

A total of 10 million pesos tax-free was given to the teams' chosen beneficiaries, with the champion team DENR Warriors taking home a trophy, and 4 million pesos given to their chosen charity institution.

During the season, the league got its fourth AnakTV award for being a child-friendly basketball tournament.

Teams 
Twelve squads are vying for the championship title of the season. There are 2 new teams and 10 returning teams, including 3 former tournament winners, led by the Season 7 defending champions AFP Cavaliers.

New Teams 
 Department of Environment and Natural Resources (DENR) Warriors
 Social Security System (SSS) Kabalikat

Defunct Teams 
 Department of Justice (DOJ) Justice Boosters – played 7 seasons from Season 1 to Season 7
 Senate of the Philippines (Senate) Defenders – played 6 seasons from Season 2 to Season 7

Group A

Group B

Elimination round 

The elimination round began on September 9, 2019 at the Mall of Asia Arena in Pasay. As part of tradition, the defending champion is to face another team on opening day based on drawing lots. The draw was performed by UNTV Cup innovator Daniel Razon and commissioner Atoy Co. In the first game of the season, the defending champion AFP Cavaliers got a big win against the PITC Global Traders, 90–70.

First round

Group A

Group B

Second round

Playoffs

Quarterfinals

TBD vs. TBD

TBD vs. TBD

TBD vs. TBD

TBD vs. TBD

TBD vs. TBD

TBD vs. TBD

Semifinals

(1) TBD vs. (4) TBD

(2) TBD vs. (3) TBD

Tatluhan 3x3 Tournament 

Tatluhan is UNTV Cup's second annual 3x3 basketball tournament that started on March 1, 2020, and concluded on March 9, 2020. It served as opener and intermission for Finals games. The eight participating teams include all agencies eliminated before the semifinals. Each game is maximum 8 minutes and has 12-second shot clock.

PITC became two-time 3x3 champions by defeating PhilHealth, 14-13. The Global Traders got ₱100,000 for Blas F. Ople Policy Center and Training Institute, while PhilHealth got ₱50,000 their chosen beneficiary.

Teams 
 Agriculture Food Masters
 GSIS Furies
 Malacañang-PSC Kamao
 Ombudsman Graft Busters
 PhilHealth Plus
 PITC Global Traders (defending champions)
 PNP Responders
 SSS Kabalikat

Bracket

Results

Battle for Third Place: (3) NHA Builders vs. (4) Judiciary Magis 

The battle for third place was between four-time semifinalist NHA Builders and two-time champion Judiciary Magis, after they lost their semifinals series on separate opponents. NHA won the game, 74–67, and got ₱1,000,000 for their chosen beneficiary as third placer. Despite the loss, Judiciary received ₱500,000 for charity as fourth placer.

UNTV Cup Finals: (1) AFP Cavaliers vs. (2) DENR Warriors 

The best-of-three finals series were held on March 1 and 9, 2020, at the Paco Arena in Manila City and Smart Araneta Coliseum in Cubao, Quezon City, respectively. The championship is between the defending three-time champion and #1 team AFP Cavaliers and rookie team DENR Warriors. AFP and DENR won their semis matchup versus Judiciary and NHA, respectively, both series in two games.

Winners and Beneficiaries 
A total of 10 million pesos tax-free will be given to the teams' chosen beneficiaries, with the champion team taking home a trophy, and 4 million pesos given to their chosen charity institution. The runner-up team will receive 2 million pesos for their beneficiary. One million pesos will be given to the third place team for their chosen beneficiary, while five hundred thousand pesos will be given to the fourth-place finishers' chosen charity. The other participating teams will get 100 thousand pesos for their beneficiary.

Individual awards

Season awards

The season's individual awards were given before the start of the Game 2 of the Finals, on March 9, 2020 at the Smart Araneta Coliseum.

Scoring Champion: Jonathan Aldave (PhilHealth Plus)
Step Up Player of the Year (Most Improved Player): Darwin Cordero (AFP Cavaliers)
Defensive Player of the Year: Marvin Mercado (NHA Builders)
First Five:
 PG: Darwin Cordero (AFP Cavaliers)
 SG: Melvin Bangal (DENR Warriors)
 SF: Chester Tolomia (Judiciary Magis)
 PF: Jonathan Aldave (PhilHealth Plus)
 C: Marvin Mercado (NHA Builders)
Most Valuable Player: 
Season MVP: Marvin Mercado (NHA Builders)
Finals MVP: Ed Rivera (DENR Warriors)

Players of the Week
The following players were named the Players of the Week.

Overall standings

Elimination rounds

Playoffs

UNTV Cup Segments

Heart of a Champion
The Heart of a Champion segment features UNTV Cup players and their lives off the court as public servants.

Top Plays
The following segment features the top plays of the week and elimination round.

Featured Segments 
UNTV Cup players, agencies, and beneficiaries share their thoughts in interviews.

See also 
 UNTV Cup
 UNTV Public Service

Notes

References

External links 
 UNTV website
 UNTV Cup website

Members Church of God International
2019 Philippine television series debuts
2019 in Philippine sport
2020 in Philippine sport
UNTV Cup
UNTV (Philippines) original programming
2019–20 in Philippine basketball
2019–20 in Philippine basketball leagues